Władysław Marconi (29 February 1848 in Warsaw - 4 June 1915 in Warsaw) – was a Polish architect and son of Enrico Marconi and Margaret Heiton, who came from a Scottish family settled in Poland. He was raised by his mother as a Calvinist.

After completing his studies in 1874 at the Imperial Academy of Arts in Saint Petersburg, he returned to Warsaw where he started his career and took part in numerous social and cultural activities. He was a co-founder of the Society for the Care of Monuments of the Past, the Circle of Architects and the construction committee for Poniatowski Bridge. He was also a member of the Warsaw Photographic Society.

Important projects

Family

Bibliography 
 Stanisław Łoza, Architects and Builders in Poland, Warsaw 1954
 Hanna Krzyżanowska, Marconi Władysław Polish Biographical Dictionary of Monument Conservators edited by Henryk Kondziela, Hanna Krzyżanowska, Poznań 2006

Links 
 Władysław Marconi w serwisie Warszawa1939.pl (in Polish)

1848 births
1915 deaths
Architects from Warsaw